Our Lady of Consolation is a Christian term honoring the Virgin Mary.

It may also refer to:

 Basilica and National Shrine of Our Lady of Consolation, Carey, Ohio, United States
 Basilica of Our Lady of Consolation, Táriba, Táchira, Venezuela 
 Shrine Church of Our Lady of Consolation and St Francis, West Grinstead, West Sussex, England.
 Santuario della Consolata, Turin, Piedmont, Italy